Kenneth Dixon (born January 21, 1994) is an American football running back who is a free agent. He played college football at Louisiana Tech, and was drafted by the Baltimore Ravens in the fourth round of the 2016 NFL Draft.

Early years
Dixon attended Strong High School in Strong, Arkansas. During the team's state title run in Dixon's senior year 2011, he ran for a state record 3,153 yards and 39 touchdowns.  For his season efforts, he was named "Mr. Football" in the state of Arkansas.

Dixon also competed in track & field at Strong.
110-meter hurdles and the long jump, and also placed 2nd in the 100-meter dash. He also was an outstanding basketball player, leading his team to the district championship as a junior.

Regarded as a three-star recruit by Rivals.com, Dixon was considered the eighth best player in the state of Arkansas. He committed to Louisiana Tech University to play college football on January 6, 2012, choosing the Bulldogs over Arkansas State, Arkansas, LSU, and Ole Miss.

College career
As a true freshman at Louisiana Tech in 2012, Dixon ran for 1,194 yards on 200 carries and set an NCAA freshman record with 27 rushing touchdowns and 28 total touchdowns. As a sophomore, Dixon played in 10 games, rushing for 917 yards on 151 carries with four touchdowns. During his junior year in 2014, Dixon became Louisiana Tech's all-time leader in rushing yards, rushing touchdowns and total touchdowns. For the season he had 1,299 rushing yards on 253 carries with 22 rushing touchdowns and six receiving touchdowns. As a senior, he rushed for 1,070 yards on 197 carries and 19 touchdowns. He finished his career with an NCAA record 87 career total touchdowns, however the record was later broken that same season by Keenan Reynolds.

Collegiate statistics

Professional career

Baltimore Ravens
Dixon was drafted by the Ravens in the fourth round, 134th overall, in the 2016 NFL Draft. He played in 12 games as the Ravens' second running back behind Terrance West. He ran for 382 yards and two touchdowns to go along with 30 catches for 162 yards and a touchdown.

On March 9, 2017, Dixon was suspended the first four games of the 2017 season for violating the league's policy on performance-enhancing drugs. On July 25, 2017, it was revealed that Dixon had suffered a torn meniscus in his left knee. The injury required surgery, and 4–5 months to recover, forcing Dixon out for the 2017 season. He was placed on injured reserve on September 1, 2017.

On September 12, 2018, Dixon was placed on injured reserve after suffering a knee injury in Week 1. He was activated off injured reserve on December 1, 2018. Overall, he finished the 2018 season with 333 rushing yards and two rushing touchdowns.

Dixon was placed on injured reserve on August 31, 2019, after suffering a fractured knee. He was waived from injured reserve with an injury settlement on September 6.

New York Jets
On December 18, 2019, Dixon was signed by the New York Jets. He was waived on August 19, 2020.

Toronto Argonauts
Dixon signed with the Toronto Argonauts of the CFL on December 29, 2020. He was released on July 27, 2021.

See also
 List of NCAA major college football yearly rushing leaders
 List of NCAA major college football yearly scoring leaders
 List of NCAA Division I FBS players with at least 50 career rushing touchdowns

References

External links
Baltimore Ravens bio
Louisiana Tech Bulldogs bio
Louisiana Tech Exposure bio

1994 births
Living people
People from El Dorado, Arkansas
Players of American football from Arkansas
American football running backs
Louisiana Tech Bulldogs football players
Baltimore Ravens players
New York Jets players
Toronto Argonauts players